Duvaucelia striata is a species of dendronotid nudibranch from the western Mediterranean. It is a marine gastropod mollusc in the family Tritoniidae.

Distribution
This species was described from Naples, Italy. It is found in the western Mediterranean from Italy to France and Spain.

Ecology
Duvaucelia striata is reported to feed on the soft coral Paralcyonium elegans.

References

Tritoniidae
Gastropods described in 1963